Yuyuanozoon magnificissimi is the largest known vetulicolian, with the holotype (and only known specimen) measuring about 202 millimeters in length. In life, it would have been an egg-shaped animal with a long cylindrical tail. The body is divided into 6 segments, with a gill opening (that has gill filaments extending out from each opening) placed symmetrically on each side of every body segment starting at the second segment. The cylindrical tail is divided into 7 segments, and differs from the tails of all other known vetulicolians (not being flattened like vetulicolids like Vetulicola, and not oar-like or leaf-like like those of the didazoonids like Didazoon, and is unlike the tails of banffozoans like Banffia and Skeemella).

The details of the tail anatomy, and of the gill openings with gill filaments currently leave Y. magnificissimi as incertae sedis.

Etymology
The generic name translates as "Animal of Yu Yuan," Yu Yuan being an ancient name for Chengjiang County. The specific name, magnificissimi, translates as "magnificent," in reference to the great size of the holotype.

See also

 Maotianshan shales

References

Notes

Cambrian animals of Asia
Vetulicolia enigmatic taxa
Fossil taxa described in 2001
Prehistoric animal genera

Cambrian genus extinctions